Beşiktaş Women's Basketball Team, or Beşiktaş HDI Sigorta, as per the sponsorship agreement, is Beşiktaş Gymnastics Club's basketball team competing in the Herbalife Nutrition Women's Basketball Super League.

Roster

Honours

National competitions
 Turkish Women's Basketball League
 Champions (3): 1984, 1985, 2005
 Runners-up (3): 1986, 2006, 2007
 Turkish Cup
 Runners-up (4): 1997, 2002, 2005, 2007
 Turkish President's Cup
 Champions (1): 2006
 Runners-up (2): 2005, 2007

International competitions
 FIBA EuroCup
 Quarter Finals (3): 2006, 2015, 2016

Notable players

Gülşah Akkaya
Melike Bakırcıoğlu
Korel Engin
Yasemin Horasan
Şaziye İvegin
Şebnem Kimyacıoğlu
Ceyda Kozluca
Sariye Kumral
Arzu Özyiğit
Tuğba Palazoğlu
Esra Şencebe
Tuğba Taşçı
Esmeral Tunçluer
Nilay Yiğit
Müjde Yüksel

Kara Braxton
Laura Harper
Amber Harris
Vanessa Hayden
Ebony Hoffman
Alexis Hornbuckle
Jantel Lavender
Stacey Lovelace-Tolbert
Cappie Pondexter
Sheri Sam
Courtney Vandersloot
Candice Wiggins

Kelly Santos
Izi Castro Marques

Gergena Baranzova

Sandra Mandir
Shavonte Zellous
Korona Longin-Zanze

Shay Doron

Jelena Spirić
Milica Dabović
Jelena Milovanović

Ilona Korstin

Evelyn Akhator

References

External links
 Beşiktaş Jimnastik Kulübü Home Page
 Unofficial Fan Site and Forum
 Beşiktaş Basketball Teams Web Site
 Besiktas Basketball Fan Blog

Beşiktaş Basketball
Women's basketball teams in Turkey
Basketball teams established in 1903